Gallmannsegg is a former municipality in the district of Voitsberg in the Austrian state of Styria. Since the 2015 Styria municipal structural reform, it is part of the municipality Kainach bei Voitsberg.

Geography
Gallmannsegg lies about 30 km northwest of Graz and southeast of the Speikkogel. The river Kainach has its source in the municipality.

References

Cities and towns in Voitsberg District